Grigory Klimov (born 10 April 1933) is a Soviet racewalker. He competed in the men's 50 kilometres walk at the 1956 Summer Olympics and the 1960 Summer Olympics.

References

1933 births
Living people
Athletes (track and field) at the 1956 Summer Olympics
Athletes (track and field) at the 1960 Summer Olympics
Soviet male racewalkers
Olympic athletes of the Soviet Union
Place of birth missing (living people)